The following is a list of Nippon Professional Baseball players with the last name starting with T, retired or active.

T
Kazuya Tabata
Koichi Tabuchi
Akihiro Tabuki
Takashi Tachikawa
Kazuhito Tadano
Masanori Taguchi
So Taguchi
Koji Tahara
Yasuaki Taihoh
Kohichi Taira
Toshio Tajima
Makoto Takada
Shigeru Takada
Takuya Takaesu
Hiromitsu Takagi
Hiroyuki Takagi
Koji Takagi
Morimichi Takagi
Taisei Takagi
Yasunari Takagi
Takayuki Takaguchi
Takuya Takahama
Akifumi Takahashi
Akinori Takahashi
Hideaki Takahashi
Hideki Takahashi
Hisanori Takahashi
Ikuo Takahashi
Kaoru Takahashi
Kazumasa Takahashi
Kazumi Takahashi
Kazuyuki Takahashi
Ken Takahashi
Koichi Takahashi
Koji Takahashi
Masahiro Takahashi
Mitsunobu Takahashi
Nobuo Takahashi
Noriyuki Takahashi
Satoshi Takahashi
Shinji Takahashi
Toru Takahashi
Toshiro Takahashi
Yoshinobu Takahashi
Yusuke Takahashi
Yuhei Takai
Shun Takaichi
Masahiro Takami
Kazuya Takamiya
Koji Takamizawa
Yuki Takamori
Hiroshi Takamura
Fumikazu Takanami
Toshihiro Takanashi
Fumitoshi Takano
Shinobu Takano
Kentaro Takasaki
Toru Takashima
Yosuke Takasu
Shingo Takatsu
Nobuyuki Takatsuka
Hiroaki Takaya
Hisashi Takayama
Ikuo Takayama
Kenichi Takayama
Tomoyuki Takayama
Izumi Takayanagi
Hisashi Takeda
Kazuhiro Takeda
Masaru Takeda
Shiro Takegami
Naotaka Takehara
Koji Takekiyo
Shota Takekuma
Kazuhiro Takeoka
Yuki Takeshima
Akifumi Takeshita
Jun Takeshita
Shintaro Takeshita
Kazuya Takeuchi
Shinichi Takeuchi
Yoshiya Takeuchi
Shingo Takeyama
Masahiro Takumi
Shigeo Tamaki
Tomotaka Tamaki
Yutaka Tamaki
Nobunori Tamamine
Hiromasa Tamano
Hitoshi Tamaru
Kenta Tamayama
Kenjiro Tamiya
Akihiro Tamura
Fujio Tamura
Hitoshi Tamura
Kei Tamura
Ryohei Tamura
Tsutomu Tamura
Manabu Tanabe
Norio Tanabe
Akira Tanaka
Daijiro Tanaka
Daisuke Tanaka
Hirokazu Tanaka
Hiroto Tanaka
Hiroyasu Tanaka
Kazunori Tanaka
Kenjiro Tanaka
Kensuke Tanaka
Kentaro Tanaka
Masahiko Tanaka
Masahiro Tanaka
Masaoki Tanaka
Mitsuru Tanaka
Mizuki Tanaka
Naoki Tanaka
Ryohei Tanaka
Satoshi Tanaka
Shintaro Tanaka
Shuta Tanaka
Sohji Tanaka
Takashi Tanaka
Toshiaki Tanaka
Yasuhiro Tanaka
Yoshiki Tanaka
Yoshio Tanaka
Yuki Tanaka
Yukio Tanaka
Kenji Tanba
Mikio Tanba
Hitoshi Taneda
Hiroya Tani
Tetsuya Tani
Yoshitomo Tani
Etsuji Taniguchi
Koichi Taniguchi
Kuniyuki Taniguchi
Shinji Taninaka
Motonobu Tanishige
Yuki Tanno
Hidenori Tanoue
Keisaburo Tanoue
Yasushi Tao
Tony Tarasco
Naoyuki Tateishi
Shohei Tateyama
Yoshinori Tateyama
Mitsuo Tatsukawa
Kazuyoshi Tatsunami
Jim Tatum
Masahiro Tazaki
Yuya Tazawa
Satoshi Tejima
Ryuhei Terada
Yuya Terada
Hayato Terahara
Masao Teramae
Hirofumi Teramoto
Shiro Teramoto
Tomokazu Teramura
Takayuki Terauchi
Bobby Thigpen
Brad Thomas
Jason Thompson
Ryan Thompson
Ozzie Timmons
Hiroshi Tobe
Masafumi Togano
Kazuhiro Togashi
Shun Tono
Hisashi Tokano
Yoshinari Tokuda
Masanori Tokumoto
Satoshi Tokumoto
Katsuki Tokura
Tetsuto Tomabechi
Kenji Tomashino
Seiji Tomashino
Akira Tominaga
Hisaki Tomioka
Yui Tomori
Yusuke Torigoe
Takashi Toritani
Kenichi Toriyabe
Shoji Toyama
Jiro Toyoda
Kiyoshi Toyoda
Yasumitsu Toyoda
Akiyoshi Toyoshima
Andy Tracy
Tomochika Tsuboi
Michinori Tsubouchi
Hidetoshi Tsuburaya
Teppei Tsuchiya
Daiki Tsuda
Chikara Tsugawa
Hatsuhiko Tsuji
Ryutaro Tsuji
Takeshi Tsuji
Toshiya Tsuji
Kento Tsujimoto
Osamu Tsujita
Takanobu Tsujiuchi
Hiroshi Tsuno
Naoto Tsuru
Kazunari Tsuruoka
Kazuto Tsuruoka
Shinya Tsuruoka
Yasushi Tsuruta
Kazuya Tsutsui
Masaya Tsutsui
Soh Tsutsui
Takeshi Tsutsumiuchi
Katsuyuki Tsuzuki
Jason Turman
Brad Tweedlie

References

External links
Japanese Baseball

 T